Ugly Beauty World Tour was the fifth concert tour by Taiwanese singer Jolin Tsai. It started on December 30, 2019, in Taipei, Taiwan at Taipei Arena and continued in Taiwan only, due to the COVID-19 pandemic, before concluding on January 8, 2023, in Taipei, Taiwan at Taipei Arena. It grossed NT$680 million from 23 shows and 250,000 attendance.

Background 
On May 22, 2015, Tsai embarked on her fourth concert tour Play World Tour in Taipei, Taiwan at Taipei Arena and continued throughout Asia and North America before concluding on July 16, 2016 in Kuala Lumpur, Malaysia at Stadium Merdeka. Tsai's manager Tom Wang said: "Tsai has grown up so much doing the tour, and later she will release a new album and prepare for a new concert tour." On February 28, 2018, Next Magazine reported that a pre-scheduled concert date in August 2018 was cancelled due to Tsai's physical condition. Tsai's manager Tom Wang responded that the cancellation was due to completion of the album was lagging behind the schedule, he added: "Her album was expected to be released in late 2017, but it was postponed until the summer of the year, since we can only go on a new tour after she released a new album, her new concert tour would not be started until 2019."

On March 14, 2018, Tsai attended the Michelin Guide Taipei 2018 Gala Dinner in Taipei, Taiwan, and she revealed that she has started to think of ideas for her new concert tour. On May 18, 2019, Tsai said on a music sharing session for Ugly Beauty in Shanghai, China that she would embark on a new concert tour later this year. On August 4, 2019, Apple Daily reported that Tsai would start her concert tour at Taipei Arena in late December of the year, and Tsai's manager Tom Wang said: "We will announce the good news after confirming the show dates."

Development 
On September 20, 2019, Tsai announced that her fifth concert tour Ugly Beauty World Tour would start on December 30, 2019, and the tickets would go on sale on October 12, 2019. It collaborated with creative production house Squared Division, and Tsai said: "This time I hope to break all rules, and bring a crazy sense to everybody", adding that: "This time I want to bring the complete visual effect of my album to the stage, build an incredible 'Ugly Beauty' magic world, and present the classic songs of my 20-year career in a different way, hope my fans feel the diligently of my production team in this 'another dimension'." On November 19, 2019, Tsai flew to Los Angeles to have a 12-day rehearsal with 16 dancers. On December 3, 2019, Tsai announced the Kaohsiung dates of the tour, and the tickets would go on sale on December 15, 2019. On December 28, 2019, it was reported that Tsai rented Hsinchuang Gymnasium for a 5-day rehearsal which costed NT$40 million, and it was reported that the performances at Taipei Arena would be documented for a video release. On December 31, 2019, China Times reported that the Taipei dates costed NT$246 million, including NT$90 million for stage props design and NT$20 for six video interludes, becoming the concert with the highest cost at Taipei Arena in history. On January 5, 2020, Tsai announced two additional Kaohsiung dates on May 9 and 10, 2020.

Since January 2020, a series of shows were successively postponed due to the COVID-19 pandemic. On October 5, 2020, Tsai announced to resume the tour on November 20, 2020. On December 22, 2020, Tsai revealed that additional Taipei dates may be added in the following year. On March 12, 2021, Tsai announced that three additional Taipei dates began on April 23, 2021. On March 22, 2021, Tsai announced that two additional Taipei dates on April 21 and 22, 2021. On January 7, 2022, due to the pandemic continued, all the originally postponed shows in China were officially cancelled. Tsai's manager Tom Wang said: "She is currently working on her new album. For concerts, epidemic prevention is the first priority, and after the epidemic is stabilized, the schedule and the cities of the tour will be further arranged." On October 13, 2022, Tsai announced that six final dates in Taipei began on December 31, 2022. On January 8, 2023, it was revealed that the tour cost a total of NT$400 million, and it grossed a total of NT$680 million from 250,000 attendance.

Commercial response 
The tickets of the Taipei dates were available for sale on October 12, 2019 at 11:28 am, and all the 66,000 tickets were sold out in three minutes. The organizers Super Dome said: "We confirmed there are no more Taipei dates." The ticket sales company tixCraft said: "All the six dates' tickets were sold out at 11:31 am, after our ticketing system cleared those unpaid orders, we will re-release those tickets around 14:00." At 14:00, those re-released tickets were sold out within one minutes. On December 9, 2019, the tickets of the Shenzhen date were available for sale at 15:00, and all the tickets were sold out within 30 seconds. On December 12, 2019, the Zhengzhou date's tickets were available for sale at 10:18 am, and all tickets were sold out within two minutes.

The tickets of Kaohsiung dates were available for sale on December 15, 2019 at 12:15 pm, and all the 30,000 tickets were sold out within five minutes. On December 20, 2019, the Tianjin date's tickets were available for sale at 12:20 pm, and all the tickets were sold out within eight minutes. On December 25, 2019, the Nanjing date's tickets were available for sale at 11:00 am, and all the tickets were sold out within one hour. On December 27, 2019, the Chengdu date's tickets were available for sale at 11:00 am, and all the tickets were sold out within 30 seconds. On January 10, 2020, the Shanghai dates' tickets were available for sale at 11:00 am, and all the tickets were sold out within 10 seconds. On January 13, 2020, the tickets of the second date of Shenzhen were available for sale at 15:00, and all the tickets were sold out within 10 seconds. On January 14, 2020, the Wuhan date's tickets were available for sale at 15:18, and all the tickers were sold out within one minute. On January 18, 2020, the two additional Kaohsiung dates' tickets were available for sale at 12:16 pm, and all the 20,000 tickets were sold out within five minutes. On October 24, 2020, the one additional Kaohsiung date's tickets were available for sale at 13:26, and all the 10,000 tickets were sold out within two minutes. On March 28, 2021, the five additional Taipei dates' tickets were available for sale at 15:28, and all the 55,000 tickets were sold out within five minutes. On November 5, 2022, the six final Taipei dates' tickets were available for sale at 15:28, and all the 66,000 tickets were sold out within six minutes.

Critical reception 
Writing for United Daily News, Tso Kuang-ping commented: "There are not many singers who can make such large-scale singing and dancing performance in the C-pop industry. Jolin Tsai is definitely second to none, and she has produced a set of work of a higher standard than expected. From everyone's reaction and word of mouth, there is no doubt about the good reviews."

Video release 
On January 16, 2023, it was reported that a live video album for the tour would be released in the same year.

Set list 
The following set list was obtained from the concert held on December 30, 2019, in Taipei, Taiwan. It does not represent all concerts for the duration of the tour. 

Act 1: The Orphan
 "Necessary Evil"
 "Sweet Guilty Pleasure"
 "The Spirit of Knight"
 "Miss Trouble"
Act 2: Unconscious Desire
 "Lady in Red"
 "Honey Trap"
 "Medusa"
 "Agent J"
 "Real Man"
 "Mr. Q"
 "Bravo Lover"
Act 3: Unhinged
 "The Great Artist"
 "J-Game"
 "36 Tricks of Love"
 "Overlooking Purposely"
 "I'm Not Yours"
Act 4: Innocent Minds
 "Sun Will Never Set"
 "Don't Stop"
 "Hubby"
 "Say Love You"
 "Karma"
 "Fantasy"
Act 5: Disclosure
 "Rewind"
 "Sky"
 "Can't Speak Clearly"
 "Romance"
 "Vulnerability"
 "The Smell of Lemon Grass"
 "Life Sucks"
 "Prague Square"
 "Love Love Love"
Act 6: Heroic Emergence
 "Dancing Diva"
 "Dr. Jolin"
 "Magic"
 "Play"
 "Womxnly"
 "Ugly Beauty"

Shows

Cancelled dates

Notes

Personnel 
Adapted from the Ugly Beauty tour book.

 Super Dome – Organizer, Production Company
 Eternal Music – Production Company
 Ke Fu-hung – Producer
 Jolin Tsai – Art Director
 Tom Wang – Producer
 Ashley Evans – Producer, Creative Director, Choreography Director, Choreographer
 Antony Ginandjar – Producer, Creative Director, Choreography Director, Choreographer
 Yang Chun-chieh – Production Coordinator
 Hsieh Yun-shan – Production Coordinator
 Liu Kuan – Engineering Coordinator
 Tseng Chi-ying – Engineering Coordinator
 Kao Hui-chen – Executive Director
 Wang Pei-yun – Executive Director
 Peng Chung-hui – Administrative Coordinator
 Wu Chih-chieh – Administrative Coordinator
 Cheng Sheng-chi – Administrative Coordinator
 Kuo I-chien – Administrative Coordinator
 Starr Chen – Music Director
 A-Hao Cheng – Music Assistant Director
 Kiel Tutin – Choreography Consultant and Supervisor, Residency Choreography Supervisor (Taipei), Choreographer
 Kaylie Yee – Creative Assistant Director, Choreography Assistant Director
 Liu Ya-yun – Executive Assistant Director
 Cheng Ju-ya – Executive Assistant Director
 Blink Inc – Concert Video Producer, Animation Designer
 Grass Jelly – Animation Designer
 Serendipity Visual Studio – Animation Designer
 Lightborne – Animation Designer
 NorthHouse – Animation Designer
 Silent Partners Studio – Animation Designer
 Wild Design Studio – Animation Designer
 Mix Code – Animation Designer
 K4s Motion Studio – Animation Designer
 Yoshiki Design – Animation Designer
 Chiu Huan-sheng – Visual Executor
 Li Hsiung-lin – Visual Executor
 Hsu Yu-ting – Visual Executor
 Marco Hsu – 20th Anniversary VCR
 Ian Lin – 20th Anniversary VCR
 Cat Grass Studio – 20th Anniversary VCR
 Elsie Liao – 20th Anniversary VCR
 Yang Ching-an – Show Executor
 Chou Ping-kun – Stage Designer
 Nathan Taylor – Stage Assistant Designer, Lighting Assistant Designer
 Chou Wen-shun – Lighting Designer
 Goh Chong Yeow – Lighting Engineer
 Tsao Wen-chuan – Lighting Engineer
 Chen Kang-chien – Sound Designer
 Hung Wei-chuan – Stage Monitor
 Wu Cheng-yu – Stage Supervisor
 Lin Meng-chan – Stage Executor
 Yang Min-lin – Stage Executor
 Lin Tse-cheng – Stage Executor
 Li Ming-hsuan – Stage Executor
 Huang Chia-yuan – Stage Executor
 Pai Fang-chen – Stage Executor
 Peng Yu-chien – Ticketing
 Jay Hung – Band Leader, Keyboard
 Mike McLaughlin – Guitar
 Gabriel Beaudoin – Guitar
 Alex Edward Morris – Drum
 Brian Chiu – Bass
 Ian Lee – Programmer
 Paula Ma – Background Vocalist Director
 Chang I-hsin – Background Vocalist
 Pin Fan – Background Vocalist
 Shao Hui-yun – Background Vocalist
 Liana Blackburn – Choreography Assistant Director, Choreographer
 Zac Brazenas – Choreography Assistant Director
 Tessandra Chavez – Choreographer
 Nika Kljun – Choreographer
 Rudy Abreu – Choreographer
 Diorrion Kiar Archer – Dancer
 Hugh Espiritu Aparente – Dancer
 Jalen Robert Forward – Dancer
 Charles Rodger Williams – Dancer
 Floris Bosveld – Dancer
 Stephen Carlos Perez – Dancer
 Dayne Christian Sempert – Dancer
 Louis Paul Di Pippa – Dancer
 Shannon Ashley Walter – Dancer
 Kaylee Ann Purtell – Dancer
 Kaitlin Reese Davin – Dancer
 Riley Patricia Groot – Dancer
 Jordan Taylor Laza – Dancer
 Elyssa Arianna Cueto – Dancer
 Oritsetsolaye Akuya – Dancer
 Jessica Rita – Ann Toatoa – Dancer
 Andy Hsu – Choreography Assistant
 Heather Picchiottino – Dance Costume Design, Concert Artist Costume Design
 Chen I – Dance Costume Manager
 Cheng Ying – Dance Costume Manager
 Chuang Pei-wen – Dance Costume Manager
 Chen I-tzu – Dance Costume Manager
 Lin Tzu-yun – Dance Costume Manager
 Hung Min-hsuan – Dance Costume Manager
 Hsia Chia-ling – Dance Costume Manager
 Chen Li-ting – Dance Costume Manager
 Hsieh Wan-hsin – Choreography Administrator
 Zhong Lin – Poster photographer
 Johnny Ho – Poster Hairstylist, Concert Hairstylist
 Ya Li – Poster Makeup Artist, Video Interlude Makeup Artist, Concert Makeup Artist
 Yii Ooi – Poster Stylist
 Yen Po-chun – Poster Main Visual Designer
 Tom Colbourne – Video Interlude Director
 Heibiemok – Video Interlude Hairstylist
 Samantha Burkhart – Video Interlude Stylist
 Wang Lei – Video Interlude Behind-the-Scenes Cinematographer
 Rino – Concert Behind-the-Scenes Cinematographer
 Ke Chun-mei – Concert Behind-the-Scenes Cinematographer
 Christine Mutton – Concert Costume Supervisor
 Lan Yu-chen – Concert Artist Costume Manager
 Lan Yu-chieh – Concert Artist Costume Manager
 Birdy Production – Concert DVD Cinematographer
 Birdy Nio – Documentary Director, Concert DVD Director
 Yen Ting – Concert DVD Director
 Kiki Shih – Documentary Producer, Concert DVD Producer
 A-Hao – Concert DVD Producer
 Friends Entertainment – News and Media Writer
 Sony Music Taiwan – News and Media Writer
 Wen Yu-min – News and Media Writer
 Lu Hsiao-hsiung – News and Media Writer
 Engineering Impact Taiwan Corp. – Engineering Coordinator, Structural Engineer, Lighting Engineer, Video Engineer
 Cheng Zhen Stage Co., Ltd. – Stage Engineer
 Lightball Taiwan – Structural Engineer
 Winly Corporation – Sound Engineerer
 CY Communications – Video Engineer
 Inshin Sound Light Co., Ltd. – Laser Engineer
 Hong Yi Tech Co., Ltd. – Special Effects Engineer
 Taiwan Show Power – Electric Engineer
 Best HD Video System – Shooting Engineer

References 

2019 concert tours
2020 concert tours
2021 concert tours
2022 concert tours
2023 concert tours
Concert tours cancelled due to the COVID-19 pandemic
Concert tours of Taiwan
Concert tours postponed due to the COVID-19 pandemic
Jolin Tsai concert tours